The Bankers of God: The Calvi Affair  ( also known as The God's Bankers) is an Italian drama film directed in 2002 by Giuseppe Ferrara.

Plot 
The film tells the story of the scandal of Banco Ambrosiano, mainly related to the figure of Roberto Calvi. The Clearstream scandal exploded as a case full of intricate affairs involving the financial world, the Vatican, the Masonic Lodge P2, the Italian Secret Service, the Secret Intelligence Service, the Italian politics, the Mafia and the Banda della Magliana.

The movie narrates in detail all these connections, trying to reconstruct events and plots. The film ends with the death of Calvi under the Blackfriars Bridge, in London, openly supporting the murder-hypothesis.

Cast 
 Omero Antonutti as Roberto Calvi
 Giancarlo Giannini as Flavio Carboni
 Alessandro Gassman as Francesco Pazienza
 Rutger Hauer as Bishop Paul Marcinkus
 Pamela Villoresi as Clara Calvi
 Vincenzo Peluso as Silvano Vittor
 Pier Paolo Capponi as Roberto Rosone
 Franco Diogene as Luigi Mennini
 Camillo Milli as Licio Gelli
 Franco Olivero as Michele Sindona

Production 
The film had a very long and troubled development. According to the director Giuseppe Ferrara, he started the project in 1986, soon after The Moro Affair, and wanted Gian Maria Volonté in the main role of Roberto Calvi. After a final rejection of the project in 1991 by producers Silvio Berlusconi and Vittorio Cecchi Gori, and with Ferrara's intention of throwing in the towel, the interest of Rai Cinema finally made the project possible 15 years later, in 2001.

In the same year, it was published also the omonymous Italian book of Mario Almerighi.

See also 
 Banco Ambrosiano
 Roberto Calvi

References

External links

Italian drama films
2002 films
2002 drama films
Biographical films about gangsters
2000s business films
Films about the Sicilian Mafia
Films directed by Giuseppe Ferrara
Films set in Vatican City
Political thriller films
Films scored by Pino Donaggio
2000s Italian films